The 2015 Indy Lights season was the 30th season of the Indy Lights open wheel motor racing series and the 14th sanctioned by IndyCar, acting as the primary support series for the IndyCar Series. The 2015 season was the second promoted by Andersen Promotions, who also promote the other steps on the Mazda Road to Indy. It was the first season for the Dallara IL-15 along with a Mazda MZR-R turbocharged 4-cylinder engine, developed by Advanced Engine Research. 2015 was the second season with Cooper Tire as the sole tire supplier. The championship was contested over 16 races, starting on March 28 at St. Petersburg, Florida and ending on September 13 at Mazda Raceway Laguna Seca.

Team and driver chart
 All drivers competed in Cooper Tire–shod Dallara chassis with Mazda AER engine.

Schedule
The 2015 schedule was released on November 3, 2014. Iowa was added in place of Pocono, whereas Sonoma was replaced by a standalone round at Laguna Seca. The rounds at St. Petersburg and Toronto were expanded to double-headers, therefore the number of races increased to 16.

Race results

Championship standings

Drivers' championship

Scoring system

 The driver who qualified on pole was awarded one additional point.
 An additional point was awarded to the driver who led the most laps in a race.
 The driver who obtained the fastest lap in a race was awarded one additional point.

 Ties in points broken by number of wins, or best finishes.

Teams' championship

References

External links
 

Indy Lights seasons
Indy Lights
Indy Lights